Elizabeth Despencer, 3rd Baroness Burghersh (c. 1342 – August 1402) was an English noblewoman born to Bartholomew de Burghersh, 2nd Baron Burghersh and Cicely, de Weyland.

Some recently constructed genealogies purport that she was first married, some time after 1347, to Maurice FitzGerald, 4th Earl of Kildare (d. 25 August 1390) and by him had at least four children. Yet it is more consistent with known dates of death of the 4th Earl of Kildare that he married instead Margaret, a daughter of the 1st Baron Burghersh. Otherwise there would be record of Kildare's divorce from Elizabeth and probably a mention in the original records of her 'remarriage' rather than of her 'marriage' to le Despencer.

But these 'recently constructed genealogies' appear to be incorrect. It is impossible that Elizabeth, wife of Maurice FitzGerald is the lady who remarried 2ndly Edward le Despencer. The reason is that Maurice died on 25 August 1390, well before Edward le Despencer's marriage. This makes it more certain that le Despencer married Elizabeth, daughter of Bartholomew de Burghersh the younger, 2nd Baron Burghersh.

She was married (it is said for the second time) some time before 1373, to Edward le Despencer, 1st Baron le Despencer (c. 24 March 1335-6 – 11 November 1375) and they had six children. Upon the death of her father on 5 April 1369, she inherited the title of Baroness Burghersh.

Children
By Maurice FitzGerald:
Gerald FitzGerald, 5th Earl of Kildare
John FitzGerald, "de jure" 6th Earl of Kildare; on his brother's death he failed to take possession of the Earldom, but was the father of
Thomas FitzGerald, 7th Earl of Kildare
Thomas FitzGerald, High Sheriff of County Limerick
Joanne, who married Donal MacCarthy Reagh, 5th Prince of Carbery.

By Edward le Despencer:
 Margaret le Despencer (died 3 November 1415), married Robert de Ferrers, 5th Baron Ferrers of Chartley
 Elizabeth le Despenser (died 10 April/11 April 1408) married (1) John FitzAlan, 2nd Baron Arundel(2) William la Zouche, 3rd Baron Zouche
 Thomas le Despencer, 1st Earl of Gloucester (22 September 1373 – 13 January 1400), married Constance of York
 Hugh Despencer
 Cicely Despencer
 Anne Despencer (died 30 October 1426) married  (1) Hugh Hastings(2) Thomas de Morley, 4th Baron Morley

Sources
Burke, John. A General and Heraldic Dictionary of the Peerages of England, Ireland, and Scotland, Extinct, Dormant, and in Abeyance. London: H. Colburn and R. Bentley, 1831, pp. 173–174.
 Weis, Frederick Lewis, Walter Lee Sheppard, David Faris, and Frederick Lewis Weis. Ancestral Roots of Certain American Colonists Who Came to America Before 1700: The Lineage of Alfred the Great, Charlemagne, Malcolm of Scotland, Robert the Strong, and Some of Their Descendants (7th edition), Baltimore, Maryland: Genealogical Publishing, 1992, pp. 73–74, lines:70-35, 70-36, 74-34, 212-34.
"Fitzgerald, Maurice, 4th Earl of Kildare", Dictionary of National Biography, (Leslie Stephen ed.), Macmillan & Co., London, 1889

References

1340s births
1402 deaths
14th-century English nobility
15th-century English nobility
14th-century English women
15th-century English women
Daughters of barons
English baronesses
Wives of knights
Barons Burghersh